Neurophruda is a genus of moths of the family Crambidae. It contains only one species, Neurophruda daulialis, which is found in India (Meghalaya).

References

Natural History Museum Lepidoptera genus database

Acentropinae
Taxa named by William Warren (entomologist)
Crambidae genera